Ludvika is a bimunicipal city and the seat of Ludvika Municipality, Dalarna County within the country of Sweden, with 14,498 inhabitants in 2010.

Overview
The conurbation of Ludvika extends over the border of Smedjebacken Municipality, where about 400 inhabitants live.

Ludvika is situated by Lake Väsman in the south-east part of the municipality.

Population of Ludvika as of 2005 distributed by municipalities:

Economy 

A major employer in Ludvika is the power engineering conglomerate Hitachi, whose activities in the town include power transformers, capacitors, ac breakers and equipment for high-voltage direct current power transmission.

Notable natives
 Stefan Anderson
 Dan Andersson
 Hypocrisy (band)
 Anders Ilar
 Christina Lampe-Önnerud
 Kee Marcello
 Charlie Norman
 Birgit Ridderstedt
 Jari Sillanpää
 Fredrik Söderström
 Anders Wendin
 Anders Winroth

Sports
The following sports clubs are located in Ludvika:

 Ludvika FK
 Östansbo IS

Schools
Lorensberga
Kyrkskolan
Junibacken skola 
Knutsbo skola

References 

Populated places in Dalarna County
Populated places in Ludvika Municipality
Populated places in Smedjebacken Municipality
Municipal seats of Dalarna County
Swedish municipal seats